Investigations in Mathematics Learning is the official research journal of the Research Council for Mathematics Learning. Information about submission can be found here. RCML seeks to stimulate, generate, coordinate, and disseminate research efforts designed to understand and/or influence factors that affect mathematics learning.

Mathematics journals